is a Japanese weightlifter. He competed at the 1960 Summer Olympics and the 1964 Summer Olympics.

References

1937 births
Living people
Japanese male weightlifters
Olympic weightlifters of Japan
Weightlifters at the 1960 Summer Olympics
Weightlifters at the 1964 Summer Olympics
Sportspeople from Hyōgo Prefecture